Hal Roach (4 November 1927 – 28 February 2012) was a prominent Irish comedian. He spent over 60 years in show business as a live performer, having also recorded albums, DVDs and was featured in the Guinness World Records for the longest-running engagement of a comedian at the same venue: 26 years at Jury's Irish Cabaret, Jury's Ballsbridge Hotel, Dublin.

Early life
Born John Roche in Waterford, where he attended the Manor Christian Brothers school, Roche began his career after winning a local talent competition as a boy soprano. He initially toured with an illusionist and specialised in magic, but later moved to comedy.

Comedy
A typical Hal Roach joke is as follows: "He told me that I have a cult following, at least I think that's what he said".

Another-
"There is a man sitting in the middle of the road casting his fishing line... now none of us is perfect, but c'mon! So I asked him, "How many have you caught today?" He said, "You're the ninth."

Perhaps his most famous catchphrase is "Write it down, it's a good one!".

He was a regular panelist on the 1970s RTÉ television show What's My Line? which was based on the original American version of the same name.

Roach has been cited as a major influence by other comedians such as Brendan Grace.

Roach was popular particularly with American tourists visiting Ireland. His act played heavily on traditional tourist imagery of Ireland and on Irish jokes. Several of his shows have been released on cassette and CD, and they are popular with tour bus drivers in several English-speaking countries who play them to passengers to help pass the time between destinations.

Death
After suffering from a long bout of ill health, Roach died on 28 February 2012. The following month, RTÉ broadcast a tribute to Roach in one of its graveyard slots, a repeat airing of a programme from the That's Entertainment series first broadcast in 1972.

Recordings

Albums
The King of Blarney Irish Records
We Irish Talk Like That Irish Records/Ceol
He Must Be Joking Irish Records/Ceol/Rajon
I Think I'm Having One of My Turns Cabaret Records
An Audience With Irish Records/Ceol/Rajon
The Best of Irish Humour Grainne Music/Ceol/Rajon
Hal Roach & Friends Ovation
Write It Down Grainne Music/Rajon
It's That Man Again! Grainne Music/Rajon
He's at It Again Grainne Music/BMG/Rajon

DVDs/videos
Hal Roach It's himself Live at Jurys Cabaret Sony BMG
An Audience With Hal Roach, The King of Blarney Emdee
Hal Roach The King of Irish Comedy (2005) Irish Records (double-DVD)
Tony Kenny's Ireland - The Green Island (guest appearance)

Books
Ireland's International Comedian: Hal Roach (His Greatest Collection of Irish Humour and Wit, featuring the "Unnecessary Sayings" of the Irish in conversation) (1995) Folens
Party Laughs (1995) Grainne Music

References

External links
Hal Roach IMDb

1927 births
2012 deaths
Irish male comedians